Music Man StingRay is an electric bass by Music Man, introduced in 1976.

History
Designed by Leo Fender, Tom Walker, and Sterling Ball, the StingRay bass appeared in 1976 and, though somewhat similar to a Fender Precision Bass, had a number of distinctive features. It employed a Humbucking pickup) and an active pre-amp powered by a 9-volt battery. The early iterations of this preamp came with a 2-band EQ (bass and treble); this range was later augmented by the optional addition of a third band (bass, midrange, and treble) model. Piezo pickups located in the bridge saddles became an option with the 3-band version. It also had the distinctive "3+1" headstock (on which three tuning machines are situated on the top and one on the bottom).

References

External links
 Official MusicMan website

Music Man electric bass guitars